Grant Richards may refer to:

Grant Richards (publisher) (1872–1948), British publisher and writer
Grant Richards (publishing house), founded in 1897 by the publisher
Grant Richards (actor) (1911–1963), American actor

See also
Richard Grant (disambiguation)